The insurrection of 10 August 1792 was a defining event of the French Revolution, when armed revolutionaries in Paris, increasingly in conflict with the French monarchy, stormed the Tuileries Palace. The conflict led France to abolish the monarchy and establish a republic.

Conflict between King Louis XVI of France and the country's new revolutionary Legislative Assembly increased through the spring and summer of 1792 as Louis vetoed radical measures voted upon by the Assembly. Tensions accelerated dramatically on 1 August when news reached Paris that the commander of the allied Prussian and Austrian armies had issued the Brunswick Manifesto, threatening "unforgettable vengeance" on Paris should harm be done to the French Monarchy. On 10 August, the National Guard of the Paris Commune and fédérés from Marseille and Brittany stormed the King's residence in the Tuileries Palace in Paris, which was defended by the Swiss Guards. Hundreds of Swiss guardsmen and 400 revolutionaries were killed in the battle, and Louis and the royal family took shelter with the Legislative Assembly. The formal end of the monarchy occurred six weeks later on 21 September as one of the first acts of the new National Convention, which established a Republic on the next day.

The insurrection and its outcomes are most commonly referred to by historians of the Revolution simply as "the 10 August"; other common designations include "the day of the 10 August" or "the Second Revolution".

Context

On 20 April 1792, France declared war against the King of Bohemia and Hungary (Austria). The initial battles were a disaster for the French, and Prussia joined Austria in active alliance against France, eventually declaring war on France on 13 June. The blame for the disaster was put upon the King and his ministers (the Austrian Committee), and after upon the Girondin party.

The Legislative Assembly passed decrees sentencing any priest denounced by 20 citizens to immediate deportation (27 May), dissolving the King's guard because it was manned by aristocrats (29 May), and establishing in the vicinity of Paris a camp of 20,000 Fédérés (8 June). The King vetoed the decrees and dismissed Girondists from the Ministry. When the King formed a new cabinet mostly of constitutional monarchists (Feuillants), this widened the breach between the King and the Assembly and the majority of the common people of Paris. These events happened on 16 June when Lafayette sent a letter to the Assembly, recommending suppression of "anarchists" and political clubs in the capital.

The King's veto of the Legislative Assembly's decrees was published on 19 June, one day before the third anniversary of the Tennis Court Oath, which had inaugurated the Revolution. The popular journée of 20 June 1792 was organized to put pressure on the King. Appearing before the crowd, the King put on the bonnet rouge of liberty and drank to the health of the nation, but refused to ratify decrees or to recall the ministers. The republican mayor of Paris, Pétion, was suspended by the Directory of the Seine département for having neglected to protect the Tuileries Palace on 20 June. On 28 June, general Lafayette left his post with the army and appeared before the Assembly to call on the deputies to dissolve the Jacobin Club and punish those who were responsible for the demonstration of 20 June. The deputies indicted the general for deserting his command. The King rejected all suggestions of escape from Lafayette, the man who had long presided over his imprisonment. The crowd burnt him in effigy at the Palais-Royal. There was no place for Lafayette beside the republican emblem, nor in the country which had adopted it. Within six weeks he was arrested whilst fleeing to England and placed in an Austrian prison. Lafayette failed because his views clashed with French national sentiment, and his passive leadership of French armies had given the Prussians time to finish their preparations and concentrate upon the Rhine undisturbed.

A decree of 2 July authorized national guards, many of whom were already on their way to Paris, to come for the Federation ceremony. A decree of 5 July declared that in the event of danger to the nation all able-bodied men could be called to service and necessary arms requisitioned. Six days later the Assembly declared la patrie est en danger (the homeland is in danger). Banners were placed in the public squares, with the words:

Toward crisis

On 3 July Pierre Vergniaud gave a wider scope to the debate by uttering a threat against the King's person: "It is in the King's name that the French princes have tried to rouse all the courts of Europe against the nation, it is to avenge the dignity of the King that the treaty of Pillnitz was concluded and the monstrous alliance formed between the Courts of Vienna and Berlin; it is to defend the King that we have seen what were formerly companies of the Gardes du Corps hurrying to join the standard of rebellion in Germany; it is to come to the assistance of the King that the émigrés are soliciting and obtaining employment in the Austrian army and preparing to stab their fatherland to the heart... it is in the name of the King that liberty is being attacked... yet I read in the Constitution, chapter II, section i, article 6: If the king place himself at the head of an army and turn its forces against the nation, or if he do not explicitly manifest his opposition to any such enterprise carried out in his name, he shall be considered to have abdicated his royal office." Vergniaud recalled the royal veto, the disorders it had caused in the provinces, and the deliberate inaction of the generals who had opened the way to invasion; and he implied it to the Assembly that Louis XVI came within the scope of this article of the Constitution. By this means he put the idea of deposing the King into the minds of the public. His speech was circulated by the Assembly through all the departments.

Evading the royal veto on an armed camp, the Assembly had invited National Guards from the provinces, on their way to the front, to come to Paris, ostensibly for 14 July celebrations. By mid-July the Fédérés were petitioning the Assembly to dethrone the king. The Fédérés were reluctant to leave Paris before a decisive blow had been struck, and the arrival on 25 July of 300 from Brest and five days later of 500 Marseillais, who made the streets of Paris echo with the song to which they gave their name, provided the revolutionaries with a formidable force.

The Fédérés set up a central committee and a secret directory that included some of the Parisian leaders and to assure direct contact with the sections. A coordinating committee had been formed of one federal from each department. Within this body soon appeared a secret committee of five members. Vaugeois of Blois, Debesse of The Drome, Guillaume of Caen, and Simon of Strasbourg were names nearly unknown to history: but they were the creators of a movement that shook France. They met at Maurice Duplay's house in the Rue Saint-Honoré, where Robespierre had his lodgings, in a room occupied by their fifth member, Antoine, the mayor of Metz. Daily meetings were held by the individual sections, and on 25 July the assembly authorized continuous sessions for them. On the 27th Pétion, who had been reinstated as Paris mayor by the Assembly on 13 July, permitted a "correspondence office" to be set up in the Hôtel de Ville. Not all sections opposed the king, but passive citizens joined them, and on the 30th the section of the Théâtre Français gave all its members the right to vote. At the section meetings, Jacobins and sans-culottes clashed with moderates and gradually gained the upper hand. On 30 July a decree admitted passive citizens to the National Guard.

On 1 August came news of a manifesto signed by the Duke of Brunswick, threatening as it did summary justice on the people of Paris if Louis and his family were harmed: "they will wreak an exemplary and forever memorable vengeance, by giving up the city of Paris to a military execution, and total destruction, and the rebels guilty of assassinations, to the execution that they have merited." This Brunswick Manifesto became known in Paris on 1 August and heated the republican spirit to revolutionary fury.

Insurrection threatened to break out on the 26 July, again on the 30 July. It was postponed both times through the efforts of Pétion, who was to present the section petitions to the Assembly on 3 August.  On 4 August, the section of the Quinze-Vingts, the Faubourg Saint-Antoine, gave the Legislative assembly an ultimatum: until 9 August to prove itself. Of the forty-eight sections of Paris, all but one concurred. Pétion informed the Legislative Assembly that the sections had "resumed their sovereignty" and that he had no power over the people other than that of persuasion. On the 9th the Assembly refused to indict Lafayette. That night the tocsin rang.

Insurrection

Throughout the night of 9 August, the sections sat in consultation. At 11 o'clock the Quinze-Vingts section proposed that each section should appoint three of its members onto a body with instructions "to recommend immediate steps to save the state" (sauver la chose publique). During the night 28 sections answered this invitation. Their representatives constituted the Insurrectional Commune.  and Chaumette went to the barracks of the Marseilles Fédérés in the section of the Cordeliers, while Santerre roused the Faubourg Saint-Antoine, and  the Faubourg Saint-Marceau.

The municipality was already in session. From midnight until three o'clock the next morning the old and new, the legal and the insurrectional communes, sat in adjoining rooms at the Town Hall (Hôtel de Ville). The illegal body organized the attack on Tuileries. The legal body, by recalling the officer in charge of the troops at the Tuileries, disorganized its defense. Between six and seven in the morning this farcical situation was brought to an end. The Insurrectional Commune informed the municipal body, in a formally worded resolution, that they had decided upon its suspension; but they would retain the mayor (Pétion), the prosecutor (Manuel), the deputy-prosecutor (Danton), and the administrators in their executive functions. The resolution stated that "When the People puts itself into a state of insurrection, it withdraws all powers and takes it to itself."

Tuileries defenses

The king had failed to buy off the popular leaders. According to Malouet, 37,000 livres had been paid to Pétion and Santerre for worthless promises to stop the insurrection. He rejected the last-minute advice, not only of Vergniaud and Guadet, now alarmed by a turn of affairs they brought about and also of his loyal old minister Malesherbes, to abdicate the throne. He was determined to defend the Tuileries. His supporters had anticipated and prepared for the attack long beforehand, and were confident of success. A plan of defense, drawn up by a professional soldier, had been adopted by the Paris department on 25 June: for it was their official duty to safeguard the Executive Power. The palace was easy to defend. It was garrisoned by the only regular troops on either side—950 veteran Swiss mercenaries of the Gardes Suisse; these were backed by 930 gendarmes, 2,000 national guards, and 200–300 Chevaliers de Saint Louis, and other royalist volunteers. Five thousand men should have been an ample defense; though it appears that, by some oversight, they were seriously short of ammunition. Police spies reported to the commune that underground passages had been constructed by which additional troops could be secretly introduced from their barracks. Mandat, the commander of the National Guard, was not very sure of his forces, but the tone of his orders was so resolute that it seemed to steady the troops. He had stationed some troops on the Pont Neuf so as to prevent a junction between the insurgents on the two sides of the river, which could prevent any combined movement on their part.

Dislocation of the defense

Pétion, the mayor of Paris, Roederer the prosecutor of the Paris department, and  Mandat, the commander of the National Guard and the officer in charge of the troops detailed for the defense of the Tuileries. Pétion professed that he had to come to defend the royal family; but at about 2 a.m., hearing himself threatened by a group of royalist gunners, he obeyed summons to the Parliament-house, reported that all precautions had been taken to keep the peace, and retired to the Mairie, where he was confined on the orders of the Insurrectional Commune. Roederer's first act was to assure the royal family that there would be no attack. His second act, when a series of bulletins from Blondel, the secretary of the department, made it clear that an attack was imminent, was to persuade Louis to abandon the defense of the palace and to put himself under the protection of the assembly. Mandat, after seeing to the defense of the palace, was persuaded by Roederer (in the third and fatal mistake of the Tuileries defense) to obey a treacherous summons from the Town Hall. Mandat knew nothing of the formation of the Insurrectional Commune, and thus he departed without any escort. He was put under arrest, and shortly after murdered. His command was transferred to Santerre.

At about 7 a.m. the head of the federal column was seen debouching on the back of the palace, there was no one to order the defense. Louis, sleepily reviewing his garrison, "in full dress, with his sword at his side, but with the powder falling out his hair," was greeted by some of the National Guards with cries of "Vive la nation!" and "A bas le véto!". Louis made no reply and went back to the Tuileries. Behind him, quarrels were breaking out in the ranks. The gunners declared they would not fire on their brethren.

Hating violence, and dreading bloodshed, Louis listened willingly to Roederer's suggestion that he should abandon the defense of the palace. The queen urged in vain that they should stay and fight. Before even a single shot had been fired, the royal family were in retreat across the gardens to the door of the Assembly. "Gentlemen," said the king, "I come here to avoid a great crime; I think I cannot be safer than with you." "Sire," replied Vergniaud, who filled the chair, "you may rely on the firmness of the national assembly. Its members have sworn to die in maintaining the rights of the people, and the constituted authorities." The king then took his seat next to the president. But Chabot reminded him that the assembly could not deliberate in the presence of the king, and Louis retired with his family and ministers into the reporter's box behind the president. There, the king was given a seat and he listened, with his customary air of bland indifference, whilst the deputies discussed his fate. The queen sat at the bar of the House, with the Dauphin on her knees.

Assault on the Tuileries

The incentive for resistance fell away with the king's departure. The means of defense had been diminished by the departure of a detachment of National Guardsmen who escorted the royal family to the National Assembly. The gendarmerie left their posts, crying "Vive la nation!", and the National Guard's inclination began to move towards the insurgents. On the right bank of the river, the battalions of the Faubourg Saint-Antoine, and, on the left, those of the Faubourg Saint-Marcel, the Bretons, and the Marseilles fédérés, marched forth as freely as if going to parade. At many places that had been ordered guarded, no resistance was put up at all, like at the Arcade Saint-Jean, the passages of the bridges, alongside the quays, and in the court of the Louvre. An advance guard consisting of men, women, and children, all armed with cutters, cudgels, and pikes, spread over the abandoned Carrousel, and around eight o'clock the advance column, led by Westermann, was in front of the palace.

The assault on the Palace began at eight o'clock in the morning. As per the King's orders, the regulars of the Swiss Guard had retired into the interior of the building, and the defense of the courtyard had been left to the National Guard. The Marseillais rushed in, fraternized with the gunners of the National Guard, reached the vestibule, ascended the grand staircase, and called on the Swiss Guard to surrender. "Surrender to the Nation!", shouted Westermann in German. "We should think ourselves dishonored!" was the reply. "We are Swiss, the Swiss do not part with their arms but with their lives. We think that we do not merit such an insult. If the regiment is no longer wanted, let it be legally discharged. But we will not leave our post, nor will we let our arms be taken from us."

The Swiss filled the windows of the château and stood motionless. The two bodies confronted each other for some time, without either of them making a definitive move. A few of the assailants advanced amicably, and, in what was taken by the revolutionaries to be a gesture of encouragement, some of the Swiss threw some cartridges from the windows as a token of peace. The insurgents penetrated as far as the vestibule, where they were met by a less friendly group of Swiss defenders of the château, commanded by officers of the Court. The two bodies of troops remained facing each other on the staircase for forty-five minutes. A barrier separated them, and there the combat began; it is unknown which side took the initiative.  The Swiss, firing from above, cleaned out the vestibule and the courts, rushed down into the square and seized the cannon; the insurgents scattered out of range. The Marseillais, nevertheless, rallied behind the entrances of the houses on the Carrousel, threw cartridges into the courts of the small buildings and set them on fire. Then the Swiss attacked, stepped over the corpses, seized the cannon, recovered possession of the royal entrance, crossed the Place du Carrousel, and even carried off the guns drawn up there. As at the Bastille, the cry of "Treachery!" went up. The attackers assumed that they had been drawn into a deliberate ambush and henceforth the Swiss were the subject of violent hatred on the part of sans-culottes.

At that moment the battalions of the Faubourg Saint-Antoine arrived, and the reinforced insurgents pushed the Swiss back into the palace. Louis, hearing from the manége the sound of firing, wrote on a scrap of paper: "The king orders the Swiss to lay down their arms at once, and to retire to their barracks." To obey this order in the midst of heavy fighting meant almost certain death and the Swiss officers in command did not immediately act upon it. However, the position of the Swiss Guard soon became untenable as their ammunition ran low and casualties mounted. The King's note was then produced and the defenders were ordered to disengage. The main body of Swiss Guards fell back through the palace and retreated under fire through the gardens at the rear of the building. They were brought to a halt near the central Round Pond, broken into smaller groups and slaughtered. Some sought sanctuary in the Parliament House: about sixty were surrounded, taken as prisoners to the Town Hall, and put to death by the crowd there, beneath the statue of Louis XIV. Out of the nine hundred Swiss on duty at the palace only about three hundred survived the fighting, and of these an estimated two hundred either died of their wounds in prison or during the September Massacres that followed. A further three hundred Swiss Guards had been sent to Normandy to escort grain convoys a few days before 10 August and escaped the massacre.

The victims of the massacre also included some of the male courtiers and members of the palace staff, although being less conspicuous than the red-coated Swiss Guards others were able to escape.  No female members of the court seem to have been killed during the massacre. According to Jeanne-Louise-Henriette Campan, after the royal family left the palace only in the company of Princess de Lamballe and Madame de Tourzel, the remaining ladies-in-waiting were gathered in a room in the queen's apartment, and when they were spotted, a man prevented an attack upon them by exclaiming, in the name of Pétion: "Spare the women! Don't disgrace the nation!"  As the queen's entire household was gathered in her apartment, this may also have included female servants. Campan also mentioned two maids outside of this room, neither of whom was killed despite a male member of the staff being murdered beside them. The ladies-in-waiting were, according to Campan, "escorted to prison."  This is more or less confirmed in the memoirs of Pauline de Tourzel, who states that when the mob entered the chamber where the ladies-in-waiting were gathered, the Princesse de Tarente approached one of the rebels and asked for his protection for her colleagues Madame de Ginestous and Pauline de Tourzel, upon which he replied: "We do not fight with women; go, all of you, if you choose". Following this example, the rest of the ladies-in-waiting departed the palace in about the same way, and all passed safely out.

The total losses on the king's side were perhaps eight hundred. On the side of the insurgents, three hundred and seventy-six were either killed or wounded. Eighty-three of these were fédérés, and two hundred and eighty-five members of these were the National Guard: common citizens from every branch of the trading and working classes of Paris, including hair-dressers, harness-makers, carpenters, joiners, house-painters, tailors, hatters, boot-makers, locksmiths, laundry-men, and domestic servants. Two female combatants were among the wounded.

Aftermath

The crisis of the summer of 1792 was a major turning-point of the Revolution. By overthrowing the monarchy, the popular movement had effectively issued a challenge to the whole of Europe; internally, the declaration of war and overthrow of the monarchy radicalized the Revolution. If the Revolution was to survive it would have to call on all of the nation's reserves.

A second revolution had, indeed, occurred, ushering in universal suffrage for men and, in effect, a republic. However, it did not have the warm and virtually unanimous support that the nation had offered the first. Events since 1789 had brought difference and divisions: many had followed the refractory priests; of those who remained loyal to the revolution some criticized 10 August while others stood by, fearing the day's aftermath. Those who had participated in the insurrection or who approved it were few in number, a minority resolved to crush counter-revolution by any means.

Among the Swiss Guards who survived the insurrection, up to 350 later joined the Revolutionary Army of the First French Republic (although this total also included discharged soldiers of the twelve Swiss line infantry regiments in French service), while others joined the counter-revolutionaries in the War in the Vendée. In 1817, the Swiss Federal Diet awarded 389 of the survivors with the commemorative medal Treue und Ehre (Loyalty and Honor).

Legislative Assembly

Over half of the Legislative Assembly's members fled and on the evening 10 August only 284 deputies were in their seats. The Assembly looked on anxiously at the vicissitudes of the struggle. So long as the issue was doubtful, Louis XVI was treated like a king. As soon as the insurrection was definitely victorious, the Assembly announced the suspension of the King. The King was placed under a strong guard. The Assembly would have liked to assign him the Luxembourg Palace, but the insurgent Commune demanded that he should be taken to the Temple, a smaller prison, which would be easier to guard.

14 July had saved the Constitutional Assembly, 10 August passed sentence on the Legislative Assembly: the day's victors intended to dissolve the Assembly and keep power in their own hands. But because the new Commune, composed of unknowns, hesitated to alarm the provinces, the Girondins were kept and the Revolution was mired in compromise. The Assembly remained for the time being but recognized the Commune, increased through elections to 288 members. The Assembly appointed a provisional Executive Council and put Monge and Lebrun-Tondu on it, along with several former Girondin ministers. The Assembly voted that the Convention should be summoned and elected by universal suffrage to decide on the future organization of the State. One of its first acts was to abolish the monarchy.

Social changes

With the fall of the Tuileries, the face of Parisian society underwent an abrupt change. The August insurrection greatly increased sans-culotte influence in Paris. Whereas the old Commune had been predominantly middle class, the new one contained twice as many artisans as lawyers—and the latter were often obscure men, very different from the brilliant barristers of 1789. Moreover, the Commune itself was little more than "a sort of federal parliament in a federal republic of 48 states". It had only a tenuous control over the Sections, which began practicing the direct democracy of Rousseau. "Passive" citizens were admitted to meetings, justices of the peace and police officers dismissed and the assemblée générale of the Section became, in some cases, a "people's court", while a new comité de surveillance hunted down counter-revolutionaries. For the Parisian nobility, it was 10 August 1792 rather than 14 July 1789 that marked the end of the ancien régime.

The victors of 10 August were concerned with establishing their dictatorship. The Commune silenced the opposition press, closed the toll gates, and seized a number of refractory priests and aristocratic notables. On 11 August the Legislative Assembly gave municipalities the authority to arrest suspects. The volunteers were preparing to leave to the front and the rumors spread rapidly that their departure was to be the signal for prisoners to stage an uprising. The wave of executions in prisons followed, what later was known as The September Massacres.

War

To convince the revolutionaries that the insurrection of 10 August had decided nothing, the Prussian army crossed the French frontier on the 16th. A week later the powerful fortress of Longwy fell so quickly that Vergniaud declared it to "have been handed over to the enemy." By the end of the month the Prussians were at Verdun, the last fortress barring the road to Paris. In the capital, there was a well-justified belief that Verdun would offer no more than a token resistance. The war, which had appeared to bring the triumph of the Revolution, now seemed likely to lead it to disaster.

On 2 September the alarm gun was fired and drums beat the citizens to their Sections again. The walls of Paris were plastered with recruiting posters whose opening sentence, "To arms, citizens, the enemy is at our gates!" was taken literally by many readers. In the Assembly, Danton concluded the most famous of all his speeches: "De l’audace, encore de l’audace, toujours de l’audace, et la France est sauvée!" (Audacity, and yet more audacity, and always audacity, and France will be saved!) Once more the sans-culottes responded and in the next three weeks, 20,000 marched from Paris for the defence of the Revolution.

References

Sources

External links

 The document by which the National Assembly formally deposed Louis XVI and called for the Convention, translated into English.

1792 events of the French Revolution
18th-century rebellions
18th century in Paris
Louis XVI
French cannibals
Incidents of cannibalism
Massacres in France
Insurgencies in Paris